Opatovice I is a municipality and village in Kutná Hora District in the Central Bohemian Region of the Czech Republic. It has about 200 inhabitants.

The Roman numeral in the name serves to distinguish it from the nearby village of the same name, Opatovice II within Uhlířské Janovice.

References

Villages in Kutná Hora District